The 1962 Wightman Cup was the 34th edition of the annual women's team tennis competition between the United States and Great Britain. It was held at the All England Lawn Tennis and Croquet Club in London in England in the United Kingdom.

References

1962
1962 in tennis
1962 in American tennis
1962 in British sport
1962 in women's tennis
1962 sports events in London
1962 in English tennis
1962 in English women's sport